Macuata is one of Fiji's fourteen Provinces, and one of three based principally on the northern island of Vanua Levu, occupying the north-eastern 40 percent of the island.  It has a land area of 2004 square kilometers.

The Province has 114 villages spread over 12 districts.  Its population of 65,983 at the 2017 census, was the fourth largest of any Fijian Province.  More than a quarter of Macuata's population (24,187 in 1996) lived in the town of Labasa.

Wiliame Katonivere has been the Chief of Macuata since 2013.

See also
Coqeloa

References

 
Macuata
Macuata